Drummond is a locality in central Victoria, Australia.

Drummond is home of the small rural Drummond Primary school and Drummond Public Hall.

References

External links

Towns in Victoria (Australia)